Abdülkadir Aksu (born 1944, Diyarbakır) is a Turkish politician from Diyarbakır. According to some sources, he is Kurdish; according to Üzeyir Tekin, he is of partial Albanian and Kurdish origin; and according to Hasan Celal Güzel, a friend of Aksu family, he is of Turkish (Turkmen) origin.

He is a member of the Community of İskenderpaşa, a Turkish sufistic community of Naqshbandi tariqah.

Early life and education 
He attended high school in Diyarbakır and in 1968 he graduated with a degree in political sciences from the Ankara University. During his time at the University he became a member of in the Free Thought Club which was as a counterweight to the Socialist Thought Club. The Free Thought Club was to be influential in politics as several members of its executive board became ministers in the Turkish Government. Aksu also founded the Diyarbakır Association in Ankara, aimed as an organization to connect the people of Diyarbakır.

Professional career 
Since his graduation, he entered the public administration and was assigned as a Kaymakam in a variety of districts. In 1985, while being the Kaymakam of Gaziantep, he was bequested with the award of the Bureaucrat of the Year.

Political career 
He was elected a member of the Grand National Assembly of Turkey, representing Diyarbakir for the Motherland Party (ANAP) in 1987. He became the Minister of the Interior in 1989 in the Government of Turgut Özal which he stayed also through the Government of Yilidirm Akbulut. During his membership in the ANAP, he was a prominent advocate of Özals conciliatory policies dubbed as the "Politics of Four Inclinations". He was again elected to parliament for Diyarbakır in the parliamentary election of 1995. He then left the Motherland Party, and joined the Welfare Party (RP), for which he served as a member of the administrative board. After the ban of the  RP in 1998, he became a member of the Virtue Party which was a predecessor of the Justice and Development Party (AKP). For the AKP, he served as the Interior Minister from 2002 to 2007 and became its party vice-chair in replacement of Dengir Mir Mehmet Firat in 2008. In May 2019 he was assigned the post of the chair of the state-owned Vakifbank.

Personal life 
He is married and is the father of two children.

References

1944 births
Living people
People from Diyarbakır
Government ministers of Turkey
Virtue Party politicians
Motherland Party (Turkey) politicians
Justice and Development Party (Turkey) politicians
Ministers of the Interior of Turkey
Ankara University Faculty of Political Sciences alumni
Deputies of Istanbul
Deputies of Diyarbakır
Members of the 24th Parliament of Turkey
Members of the 23rd Parliament of Turkey
Members of the 22nd Parliament of Turkey
Members of the 21st Parliament of Turkey
Members of the 20th Parliament of Turkey
Naqshbandi order